Castle Creek may refer to one of the following:

Australia 

 Castle Creek, Queensland, a locality in the Shire of Banana

Canada 

Castle Creek (Fraser River), near McBride, British Columbia

United States 

Castle Creek (Arizona), a hot spring and the location of the Castle Hot Springs resort
Castle Creek (Hyco River tributary), a stream in Person County, North Carolina
Castle Creek (Rogue River tributary), a stream in Oregon 
Castle Creek (South Dakota), a tributary of Rapid Creek in western South Dakota
Castle Creek (Grand County, Utah) near Moab, tributary of the Colorado River
Castle Creek (Virginia) in Isle of Wight County, Virginia
Castle Creek (Washington) on Mount St. Helens
Castle Creek, New York, a hamlet north of Binghamton, New York

Other 

Castle Creek, band on Roulette Records who sang "I Can Make It Better"